Joseph Katchik, Jr. (January 9, 1931 – February 9, 2014) was an American football defensive tackle who played one season with the New York Titans of the American Football League (AFL). He was drafted by the Los Angeles Rams of the National Football League (NFL) in the tenth round of the 1954 NFL Draft. Katchik was born at Plymouth, Pennsylvania where he was educated in the public schools. From 1949 to 1950, he prepared for college at Wyoming Seminary in Kingston, Pennsylvania after which he enrolled at the University of Notre Dame before transferring to Dickinson College.

College career
Katchik first played college football for the Notre Dame Fighting Irish. He transferred to play football and basketball for the Dickinson Red Devils of Dickinson College.

Professional career
Katchik was selected by the Los Angeles Rams of the NFL with the 118th pick in the 1954 NFL Draft. He played in two games for the AFL's New York Titans during the 1960 season.

References

External links
Just Sports Stats

1931 births
2014 deaths
Players of American football from Pennsylvania
American football defensive tackles
Notre Dame Fighting Irish football players
Dickinson Red Devils football players
Dickinson Red Devils men's basketball players
New York Titans (AFL) players
People from Plymouth, Pennsylvania
American men's basketball players
Wyoming Seminary alumni